Ibón de Tebarray is a semi-frozen  lake in the Province of Huesca, northeastern Spain.

References

Tebarray
Geography of the Province of Huesca